The Freak of Araby is an album by Sir Richard Bishop, released on May 26, 2009, on the Drag City record label. It includes cover versions of several songs written by the Egyptian guitarist/composer Omar Khorshid.

Track listing
Taqasim For Omar - 7:16
Enta Omri - 2:45
Barbary - 2:20
Solenzara - 5:01
The Pillars Of Baalbek - 5:18
Kaddak El Mayass - 3:26
Essaouira - 2:21
Ka'an Azzaman - 2:51
Sidi Mansour - 6:03
Blood-Stained Sands - 7:26

References

2009 albums
Richard Bishop (guitarist) albums
Drag City (record label) albums